Tengiz Meskhadze (born 8 February 1969) is a Georgian boxer. He competed in the men's welterweight event at the 1996 Summer Olympics.

References

1969 births
Living people
Male boxers from Georgia (country)
Olympic boxers of Georgia (country)
Boxers at the 1996 Summer Olympics
Sportspeople from Kutaisi
Welterweight boxers
20th-century people from Georgia (country)